Compsotorna is a genus of moths of the family Xyloryctidae.

Species
 Compsotorna eccrita Turner, 1917
 Compsotorna oligarchica Meyrick, 1890

References

Xyloryctidae
Xyloryctidae genera